is the seventh studio album by the Japanese girl band Princess Princess, released on January 21, 1993, by Sony Records. It includes the single "Power"/"Regret". The title track features all members on vocals. The initial release featured a "clockwork" cover with a disc that could be spun to feature the band members in different makeup.

The album became the fifth and final consecutive No. 1 release on Oricon's albums chart. It was also certified Platinum by the RIAJ.

Track listing 
All music is composed by Kaori Okui, except where indicated; all music is arranged by Princess Princess.

Charts

Certification

References

External links
 
 
 

Princess Princess (band) albums
1993 albums
Sony Music Entertainment Japan albums
Japanese-language albums